Lori Wick is an author of Christian Romance novels. She writes a combination of historical and contemporary inspirational romance novels. Many of her books are published by Harvest House.

Awards and honors
Wick won the 2005 Christian Retailing's Best—Women's Fiction, and INSPY listed her as one of the "Authors who Brought Inspirational Fiction into the 21st Century." She is a four-time finalist for the ECPA Gold Medallion Award.

Personal life
Wick lives in Wisconsin with her husband and three children.

Bibliography

Place Called Home series 
 A Place Called Home, 1990
 A Song for Silas, 1990
 The Long Road Home, 1991
 A Gathering of Memories 1991

The Californians series 
Following a family who moves from their home of Hawaii to be in California.
 Whatever Tomorrow Brings, 1992
 As Time Goes By,  1992
 Sean Donovan, 1993
 Donovan's Daughter, 1994

Kensington Chronicles series 
 The Hawk and the Jewel, 1993
 Wings of the Morning, 1994
 Who Brings Forth the Wind, 1994
 The Knight and the Dove, 1995

Rocky Mountain Memories series 
Following members of several communities in Colorado Territory.

 Where the Wild Rose Blooms, 1996
 Whispers of Moonlight, 1996
 To Know Her By Name, 1997
 Promise Me Tomorrow, 1997

The Yellow Rose trilogy 
Following the 3 Rawlings brothers in Texas
 Every Little Thing About You, 1999
 A Texas Sky, 2000
 City Girl, 2001

English Garden series 
A series featuring multiple families in Collingbourne, England in the 1800s.

 The Proposal, 2002
 The Rescue, 2002
 The Visitor, 2003
 The Pursuit, 2003

Tucker Mills trilogy 
Stories of 3 families living in the town of Tucker Mills.

 Moonlight On The Millpond, 2005
 Just Above a Whisper, 2005
 Leave a Candle Burning, 2006

Big Sky Dreams series 
 Cassidy, 2007
 Sabrina, 2007
 Jessie, 2008

Standalone novels 
 Sophie's Heart, 1995
 Pretense, 1998
 The Princess, 1999 (republished in 2006)
 Reflections of a Thankful Heart, 2000
 Bamboo and Lace, 2001
 Kirby, the Disgruntled Tree, 2002
 Every Storm, 2004
 White Chocolate Moments, 2007

Collections and short stories 
 Beyond the Picket Fence: And Other Short Stories, 1998
 Be Careful with My Heart
 Christmas For Two
 The Haircut
 Beyond the Picket Fence
 An Intense Man
 The Camping Trip
 The Christmas Gift
 The Rancher's Lady
 The Best of Lori Wick...A Gathering of Hearts: A Treasured Collection from Her Bestselling Novels, 2009
 Lori Wick Short Stories, Vol. 1: Be Careful with My Heart, The Haircut, 2017
 Lori Wick Short Stories, Vol. 2: Beyond the Picket Fence 2017
 Lori Wick Short Stories, Vol. 3: An Intense Man, The Camping Trip, 2017
 Lori Wick Short Stories, Vol. 4: The Rancher's Lady, 2017
 Lori Wick Short Stories, Christmas Special: Christmas for Two, The Christmas Gift, 2017

References

Beyond the Picket Fence by Lori Wick. Printed copy. Copyrighted 1998.

External links 
 Harvest House listing for Lori Wick
 New Release Tuesday listing for Lori Wick

Living people
American historical novelists
Christian novelists
American women novelists
Women historical novelists
Year of birth missing (living people)
21st-century American women